Granlia is a neighbourhood in the city of Kristiansand in Agder county, Norway.  The neighborhood is located in the borough of Vågsbygd and in the district of Vågsbygd. Granlia is north of Vågsbygd sentrum, south of Karuss, west of Kjerrheia, and east of Nordtjønnåsen.

Transportation

References

Geography of Kristiansand
Neighbourhoods of Kristiansand